De Bisschop is a Dutch surname meaning "the bishop". Notable people with the surname include:

 Eric de Bisschop (1891–1958), French seafarer
 Jan de Bisschop (1628–1671) Dutch painter
 Jules De Bisschop (1879–1955), Belgian rower
 Ludovicus de Bisschop (c.1520–1595), Flemish composer

See also 
 Bisschop

Dutch-language surnames